Paul Donald Wight II (born February 8, 1972) is an American professional wrestler and actor. He is signed to All Elite Wrestling (AEW) as an in-ring performer, and as a commentator for its web television show, AEW Dark: Elevation, under his real name of Paul Wight. He is best known for his tenure with World Championship Wrestling (WCW) from 1995 to 1999 as The Giant and with the World Wrestling Federation (WWF, later WWE) since 1999 under the ring name (The) Big Show.

Wight played college basketball at Wichita State University before transferring to other schools. Wight began his wrestling career in 1994. In 1995 he signed with WCW, where, due to his very large frame, he was known by the ring name The Giant (and was initially introduced as "the son of André the Giant"). In early 1999, he left WCW to join the World Wrestling Federation (WWF). 

Between WWF/WWE and WCW, he has held 23 total championships - including being a seven-time world champion, having held the WCW World Heavyweight Championship twice, the WWF/WWE Championship twice, WWE's World Heavyweight Championship twice and the ECW World Heavyweight Championship once, (making him the only wrestler who has won all four titles), and an 11-time world tag team champion, holding the WWF/World, WWE and WCW World Tag Team Championships multiple times with various partners. Having also won the Intercontinental, United States and Hardcore championships, he is the 24th Triple Crown and 12th Grand Slam winner in WWE history. He also won the 60-man battle royal at World War 3 and the 30-man André the Giant Memorial Battle Royal at WrestleMania 31. He has headlined multiple pay-per-view events for WCW and WWF/WWE since 1995, including the 2000 edition of WWE's premier annual event, WrestleMania.

Outside of professional wrestling, Wight has appeared in feature films and television series such as Jingle All the Way, The Waterboy, Star Trek: Enterprise, and two USA Network's comedy-dramas Royal Pains, Psych and the action-drama Burn Notice. He had lead roles in the WWE Studios comedy film Knucklehead and the Netflix sitcom The Big Show Show.

Early life 
Wight was born February 8, 1972, in Aiken, South Carolina. He was born with acromegaly, a disease of the endocrine system that causes accelerated growth. He underwent successful surgery in the early 1990s on his pituitary gland, which halted the growth. In 2005, he leased a bus and hired a bus driver because of the practical problems his size presents to air travel and car rental.

He played basketball and American football in high school at Wyman King Academy in Batesburg-Leesville, South Carolina. He was a standout center for the basketball team and a tight end for the football team. He quit football after his freshman year because of disputes with the coach. He continued to support the team by joining the cheerleading squad as a sophomore, partly from spite. He later called it "the greatest experience of my life... Everybody else was riding a bus with sweaty equipment, and I'm in a van with seven cheerleaders who are all learning about life". The van was driven by "a mom who was deaf in her right ear and chain-smoked".

He played basketball at Wichita State University. Before that, he attended Northern Oklahoma Junior College in Tonkawa, Oklahoma, where his basketball averages of 14 points and 6.5 rebounds earned him all-conference honors and helped the team win the Western Division of the Oklahoma Bi-State Conference. He also attended Southern Illinois University Edwardsville from 1992 to 1993, was a member of the National Collegiate Athletic Association (NCAA) Division II Cougars basketball team, and is a member of the Xi Beta chapter of Tau Kappa Epsilon fraternity at Southern Illinois University-Edwardsville. During his one year at SIUE, he scored 39 points for the Cougars in limited action.

Professional wrestling career

Early career (1994–1995) 

After school, Wight worked various jobs including bouncing, bounty hunting, and answering phone calls. Through doing the latter for a karaoke company, he met Danny Bonaduce in a live microphone amateur contest on his morning radio show. Bonaduce introduced Wight to his friend, Hulk Hogan. They had an informal basketball game, as part of a World Championship Wrestling (WCW) promotion for an upcoming show at the Rosemont Horizon. Hogan liked how Wight worked the crowd and recommended him to World Championship Wrestling's vice president, Eric Bischoff. Wight went to the Horizon show, and was invited into the locker room, where he met Ric Flair, Arn Anderson (his boyhood hero) and Paul Orndorff. He later met Bischoff there and came to a deal. Wight had previously wrestled one match: on December 3, 1994, at a World Wrestling Association show in Clementon, New Jersey, he lost by countout to WWA Heavyweight Champion Frank Finnegan.

Wight had earlier attempted to inquire about joining the WWF, also at the Horizon, during an autograph session. Promoter and scout Bob Collins turned him away after he admitted he had no experience. He paid Larry Sharpe's Monster Factory $5,000, but due to Sharpe's gout at the time, he was only very minimally trained (Johnny Polo taught him the collar-and-elbow lockup). While there, he made an audition tape and gave it to Mike Chioda, whom he had met in a Philadelphia bar. Chioda forwarded it to Pat Patterson, who did not bother watching it because he assumed Wight was another wrestler, Kurrgan. Only when he saw The Giant debut in WCW did Patterson realize his mistake, much to Vince McMahon's displeasure.

World Championship Wrestling

WCW World Heavyweight Champion (1995–1996) 
In 1995, Wight signed with WCW. He debuted in May 1995 at Slamboree, where he was billed as the son of André the Giant (although this was later dropped) and accordingly used the ring name "The Giant" as a member of Kevin Sullivan's Dungeon of Doom stable. Wight made his professional in-ring debut at Halloween Havoc against Hulk Hogan for the WCW World Heavyweight Championship. He won the match after Hogan's manager, Jimmy Hart, purposely got Hogan disqualified and then turned on him. The next night The Giant showed up on WCW Monday Nitro wearing the championship belt; Hart, who became The Giant's manager, revealed that he had put a stipulation in the contract for the match that if Hogan lost via disqualification, he would lose his championship. WCW responded by nullifying the title change due to the circumstances surrounding it and the championship was vacated.

The Giant then entered the sixty-man battle royal contested for the vacant championship at World War 3 in November 1995. He was one of the final six combatants, being eliminated simultaneously with Sting and Lex Luger by Hogan. The Giant did not leave the ring upon being eliminated and pulled Hogan underneath the ropes while Randy Savage was eliminating the One Man Gang from the match. The referee did not see The Giant's actions, only that Hogan was on the floor, and thus awarded the match and the title to Savage. The Giant teamed with Ric Flair to defeat Hogan and Savage at Clash of the Champions XXXII, but was defeated by Hogan in a cage match at SuperBrawl VI. After a short feud with Loch Ness, The Giant regained the World Heavyweight Championship by defeating Flair. After Hogan formed the New World Order (nWo), he defeated The Giant for the title at Hog Wild following interference from Scott Hall and Kevin Nash.

New World Order (1996–1999) 

The Giant joined the nWo 23 days later, citing Ted DiBiase's money as his primary motivation, feuding with Lex Luger and the Four Horsemen. After winning the battle royal at World War 3, Giant asked Hogan for a World Heavyweight Championship title match. For this, he was thrown out of the nWo on December 30. He fought against the nWo along with Sting and Luger, winning the WCW World Tag Team Championship twice.

In 1997, The Giant began a feud with nWo member Nash, who constantly dodged the Giant, including no-showing their scheduled match at Starrcade. In 1998, at Souled Out, the two finally met in the ring, with Nash accidentally injuring The Giant's neck when he botched his signature jackknife powerbomb finisher. The botch was worked into a storyline, according to which Nash had intentionally dropped the Giant on his head in order to break his neck. When Nash left the nWo and formed his own stable, the nWo Wolfpac, The Giant rejoined the original nWo to oppose Nash and his allies. While back with the nWo, The Giant won two more Tag Team Championships, once with Sting as an unwilling partner (as the match was signed before The Giant returned to the nWo) and once with Scott Hall. In the interim between those two reigns, he lost his half of the titles to Sting in a singles match where only the winner would remain champion and could choose a new partner.

On the October 12, 1998, episode of Nitro, Bill Goldberg defeated The Giant in a no-disqualification match. In a show of strength, Goldberg executed a delayed vertical suplex before executing the Jackhammer on The Giant. After the nWo Hollywood and nWo Wolfpac stables merged again in January 1999, Hogan declared that there was only room for one "giant" in the group, forcing Giant and Nash to wrestle for that spot. Nash defeated Giant following a run-in by Scott Hall and Eric Bischoff. The Giant was then attacked by the entire nWo. On the "Building An Army" episode of the Monday Night War feature from the WWE Network, Wight stated that he was making a fraction of what the main eventers were making and his salary was not increased after he requested it be by Eric Bischoff; as a result, Wight allowed his WCW contract to expire on February 8, 1999, his 27th birthday.

World Wrestling Federation / World Wrestling Entertainment

WWF Champion (1999–2003) 

Wight signed a ten-year contract with the World Wrestling Federation in the midst of the promotion's "Attitude Era" . He debuted on February 9, 1999 under the name "Paul Wight" at St. Valentine's Day Massacre: In Your House, establishing himself as a member of Vince McMahon's villainous stable, the Corporation. During McMahon's cage match against Stone Cold Steve Austin, Wight tore through the canvas from underneath the ring and attacked Austin, establishing himself as a heel. After he threw Austin into the side of the cage, the cage broke, causing Austin to fall outside to the floor, resulting in Austin winning the match. Wight subsequently served as McMahon's enforcer.

Renamed as The Big Show, he made his WrestleMania debut at WrestleMania XV, facing Mankind for the right to referee the main event between Austin and The Corporation's WWF Champion The Rock. However, Big Show incapacitated Mankind and was disqualified in the process, losing the match. After the match, McMahon slapped him, so he punched McMahon, turning face and leaving The Corporation. After being defeated by Mankind in a Boiler Room Brawl, they formed a stable with Test, and Ken Shamrock known as The Union, who fought against the Corporation and later The Corporate Ministry. On the June 7 episode of Raw, Big Show faced The Undertaker for the WWF Championship, which ended by referee stoppage and Undertaker retained his title. Big Show later turned heel once again by teaming with Undertaker, wrestling against X-Pac and Kane at SummerSlam, and they won the WWF Tag Team Championship twice.

After The Undertaker was sidelined with injuries, Big Show turned face once again and began a feud with the Big Boss Man around the death of Big Show's father (in reality, Wight's father had died years before). During his feud, they taped a segment where Big Boss Man invaded the funeral and used a chain to steal the coffin. Big Show then took on Big Boss Man, Prince Albert, Mideon and Viscera at Survivor Series in a 4-on-1 elimination match. His feud was poorly received, winning the Wrestling Observer Newsletter's "Worst Feud Award" and he won the match after Big Boss Man was counted out. Later that night, Big Show participated in a Triple Threat match against The Rock and the WWF Champion, Triple H, winning the title. At that point, WWF looked for something new and fresh, so they gave the title to Big Show. Despite Big Show retaining the title at Armageddon against Big Boss Man, he lost the title against Triple H on the January 3, 2000, episode of Raw. Trying to regain the title, Big Show participated in the Royal Rumble match where he was last eliminated by The Rock. They started a storyline where Big Show turned heel once again by producing a videotape that showed The Rock's feet striking the ground first, leading to a match with The Rock at No Way Out, with the WrestleMania title shot on the line. At No Way Out, Big Show defeated The Rock when Shane McMahon interfered, knocking out The Rock with a chair shot. The Rock was desperate to reclaim his title shot and eventually agreed to a match with Big Show on the March 13 episode of Raw – if he won, the WrestleMania title match would become a Triple Threat match, and if he lost, he would retire from the WWF. Shane McMahon, now actively supporting Big Show's bid to become champion, appointed himself as the special guest referee. However, The Rock defeated Big Show when Vince McMahon assaulted Shane and donned the referee shirt, personally making the three count. On the March 20 episode of Raw, Triple H defended the title against The Rock and Big Show on the condition that the match would not take place at WrestleMania 2000, pinning Big Show. Linda McMahon stated this match would not occur at WrestleMania as Triple H would defend the title there in a Fatal Four-Way Elimination match, with Mick Foley as the fourth man. Big Show was the first man eliminated from the match at WrestleMania after the other three competitors worked together against him.

After WrestleMania, Big Show turned face again and took on a comical gimmick where he began mimicking other wrestlers, lampooning Rikishi as Showkishi, The Berzerker as Shonan the Barbarian, and Val Venis as The Big Showbowski. He defeated Kurt Angle at Backlash dressed like Hulk Hogan as the Showster, complete with skullcap/wig and yellow tights. Show began feuding with Shane McMahon after Shane voiced his disapproval of Big Show's antics. At Judgment Day, Shane defeated Big Show in a Falls Count Anywhere match following interference from Big Boss Man, Bull Buchanan, Test, and Albert. Big Show returned two months later, apparently intending to gain revenge on Shane. Instead, he turned heel again and attacked The Undertaker and sided with Shane once more, forming a short-lived stable known as "The Conspiracy" with Shane, Chris Benoit, Kurt Angle, and Edge and Christian. After The Undertaker threw Big Show off a stage through a table on the August 7, 2000, episode of Raw, he was removed from WWF television for the remainder of the year. Big Show was sent to Ohio Valley Wrestling, a WWF developmental territory, to lose weight and improve his cardiovascular fitness.

Big Show returned at the Royal Rumble, but was eliminated by The Rock. Angered by his quick elimination, Big Show proceeded to chokeslam The Rock through the broadcast table before leaving the arena. He then began competing for the WWF Hardcore Championship and at No Way Out, Big Show defeated Raven to win the championship. He would lose the title to Raven on the March 19 episode of Raw. Big Show lost to Kane in a Triple Threat match for the Hardcore Championship that also included Raven at WrestleMania X-Seven. Throughout The Invasion, Big Show remained loyal to the WWF. He faced Shane McMahon, the on-screen owner of WCW, in a Last Man Standing match at Backlash and was defeated following interference from Test. He turned face again soon after. Big Show was also part of the victorious Team WWF at Survivor Series, though he was the first man eliminated.

Shortly after WrestleMania X8, Big Show was drafted to the Raw brand. On the April 22 episode of Raw, Big Show turned heel again when he chokeslammed Stone Cold Steve Austin during a tag team match against X-Pac and Scott Hall, joining the nWo in the process. At Judgment Day, Big Show and Ric Flair were defeated by Austin in a Handicap match. The stable disbanded after Kevin Nash was injured. After the nWo disbanded, Big Show achieved little success on Raw, losing matches against Jeff Hardy, Booker T, and the Dudley Boyz.

In October, Big Show was traded to the SmackDown! brand, immediately challenging Brock Lesnar for the WWE Championship. During this time, Big Show adopted a new attire, donning black jeans and taking on a new hairstyle and facial hair. Big Show won the WWE Championship by defeating Lesnar at Survivor Series, ending Lesnar's undefeated streak with help from Paul Heyman. He lost the title to Kurt Angle a month later at Armageddon. Then SmackDown! general manager Stephanie McMahon announced that Big Show would wrestle Chris Benoit on the December 26 episode of SmackDown! in a match to determine who would face Angle at the Royal Rumble. He lost to Benoit after Benoit pinned him. After the match, Benoit was brutally attacked by Big Show and Angle. At the Royal Rumble, Big Show lost a Royal Rumble qualifying match to Brock Lesnar. He then began feuding with The Undertaker, after Big Show threw him off the stage, injuring his neck, leading to Big Show and his partner A-Train losing to The Undertaker at WrestleMania XIX. He renewed his feud with Lesnar, wrestling him four times for the WWE Championship (including a Stretcher match at Judgment Day), but was unsuccessful in his attempt to regain the title. On the June 12 episode of SmackDown!, Lesnar superplexed Big Show off the ropes and the ring imploded, two ring posts moved and three rows of ropes came down. The referee called for the event physician Dr. Burke, EMTs, medics, trainers, and even more referees. This kept the title in Lesnar's hands and both went to the hospital. On the June 26 episode of SmackDown!, Big Show, Shelton Benjamin, and Charlie Haas defeated Mr. America (a disguised Hulk Hogan), Lesnar, and Angle in a six-man tag team match when Big Show pinned Mr. America. This was Hogan's last appearance as Mr. America. For several months afterwards, WWE hyped up Big Show as the man who retired Hogan.

United States Champion (2003–2005) 

At No Mercy, Big Show defeated Eddie Guerrero for the WWE United States Championship. He then allied with then-WWE Champion Brock Lesnar. He was eliminated by Chris Benoit at the Royal Rumble. Big Show abandoned a departing Lesnar immediately before WrestleMania XX. At WrestleMania XX, Big Show lost the United States Championship to John Cena. On the April 15, 2004, episode of SmackDown!, Big Show promised to quit if he failed to defeat Eddie Guerrero that night. He lost to Guerrero after Guerrero performed a Frog Splash, and, believing that Torrie Wilson had laughed at him for losing, upended her car and threatened to throw her off a ledge. Then General Manager of SmackDown! Kurt Angle ascended the ledge to try to talk some reason into Big Show, but he chokeslammed Angle off the ledge, kayfabe concussing him and breaking his leg, as well as causing the back of Angle's head to bleed. After the show, Big Show was neither seen nor heard from on WWE television for months as he had knee surgery on April 24.

In August, Big Show was reinstated by new General Manager Theodore Long, as he interfered during a Lumberjack match between Eddie Guerrero and Kurt Angle on the September 9 episode of SmackDown!. Big Show had a choice to face either Guerrero or Angle at No Mercy, choosing to fight Angle, turning face in the process. Big Show defeated Angle at No Mercy. In the weeks before the match, he claimed to have "lost his dignity" when Angle tranquilized him in the middle of the ring using a dart gun and shaved his head on the fifth anniversary episode of SmackDown!. At No Way Out, he faced John "Bradshaw" Layfield (JBL) for the WWE Championship in the first-ever Barbed Wire Steel Cage match. He chokeslammed JBL through the ring and broke the lock on the door but JBL crawled from under the canvas and won. Big Show attacked JBL but The Cabinet attacked Big Show until Batista attacked The Cabinet and John Cena attacked JBL as he crawled away.

At WrestleMania 21, Big Show faced Sumo Grand Champion Akebono in a worked sumo match; the match was added to the show to attract a strong pay-per-view audience in Japan, where Akebono is considered a sporting legend. In the weeks preceding the match, Big Show pushed over a jeep driven to the ring by Luther Reigns to show that he was capable of moving the marginally heavier Akebono. Big Show lost to Akebono at WrestleMania 21. Big Show subsequently feuded with Carlito and his bodyguard, Matt Morgan, losing a match to Carlito at Judgment Day after Morgan interfered.

On the June 27 episode of Raw, Big Show was drafted to the Raw brand in the 2005 WWE draft lottery; preventing him from participating in a scheduled Six-Man Elimination match for the SmackDown! Championship. He successfully pinned Gene Snitsky in a tag team match, which turned into a singles match when both men's partners brawled backstage. After squashing his scheduled opponents for several weeks, Wight returned to his rivalry with Snitsky. On the August 22 episode of Raw, he foiled Snitsky's harassment of backstage interviewer Maria. The following week, Snitsky hit Big Show with the ring bell immediately after Big Show had won a match. As a result, Big Show and Snitsky were placed in a match at Unforgiven, in which Big Show defeated Snitsky. On the September 26 episode of Raw, Big Show defeated Snitsky again in a Street Fight.

Teaming with Kane (2005–2006) 

On the October 17 episode of Raw, Big Show defeated Edge and was thus entered in an online opinion poll, with the winner of the poll facing John Cena and Kurt Angle in a Triple Threat match for the WWE Championship at Taboo Tuesday. The poll was won by Shawn Michaels, meaning that the other two wrestlers competed for the World Tag Team Championship. At Taboo Tuesday, Big Show teamed with Kane to defeat Lance Cade and Trevor Murdoch for the World Tag Team Championship.

In the weeks preceding Survivor Series, Big Show became involved in the rivalry between the Raw and SmackDown! brands. Big Show and Kane invaded the November 11 episode of SmackDown! and, along with Edge, attacked Batista (inadvertently injuring him in the process). On the November 14 episode of Raw, Big Show and Kane defeated SmackDown! wrestlers and reigning WWE Tag Team Champions MNM in an inter-brand, non-title match. On the November 21 episode of Raw, Big Show and Kane "injured" Batista by delivering a double chokeslam onto the windshield of a car. At Survivor Series, Big Show, Kane, Carlito, Chris Masters, and team captain Shawn Michaels represented Raw in a match with Team SmackDown! (JBL, Rey Mysterio, Bobby Lashley, Randy Orton, and Batista). Big Show was eliminated by Mysterio and Team SmackDown! won the match, with Orton being the sole survivor. On the November 29 SmackDown! Special, Big Show wrestled Rey Mysterio in an inter-brand promotional match, however, Kane interfered, resulting in the match being declared a no-contest. Following the match, Big Show and Kane attacked Mysterio until The Undertaker chased them from the ring. Big Show and Kane returned to SmackDown! on December 2, defeating Mysterio and JBL after JBL abandoned the match, claiming the referee had poked him in the eye. Following the match, Big Show and Kane's attempt to assault Mysterio was once again foiled, this time when Batista ran in to see them off. As a result, on the December 16 episode of SmackDown!, Big Show and Kane were booked to face Batista and Mysterio, the WWE Tag Team Champions, at Armageddon. Big Show and Kane defeated Batista and Mysterio at Armageddon.

On the December 12 episode of Raw, Big Show took part in a qualifying match for a shot at the WWE Championship in an Elimination Chamber match at New Year's Revolution. Big Show lost to his opponent, Shawn Michaels, by disqualification after Triple H hit Michaels with a chair, intentionally costing Big Show the match and the title shot. In retaliation, Big Show cost Triple H his qualifying match with Kane later that evening. On the December 26 episode of Raw, during the contract-signing for the match between Big Show and Triple H at New Year's Revolution, Triple H struck Big Show in the hand that Big Show favored when using the chokeslam with his sledgehammer. The following week, Big Show attacked Triple H while wearing a cast on his hand, using the padding provided by the cast to punch a hole in a chair held by Triple H, destroying a monitor from the broadcast table that Triple H intended to throw at him, and chasing Triple H away from the ring. At New Year's Revolution, Triple H defeated Big Show after striking him in the head with his sledgehammer and a Pedigree.

Subsequently, Big Show was one of eight participants in the 2006 Road to WrestleMania Tournament, the winner of which would receive a shot at the WWE Championship at WrestleMania 22. On the February 16 episode of Raw, Big Show faced Triple H in the tournament semi-finals in a match that ended in a double count-out. As a result, Big Show and Triple H faced Rob Van Dam (the winner of the opposing semi-finals) in a Triple Threat match to determine the winner of the tournament on the February 20 episode of Raw. The match was won by Triple H after he pinned Van Dam.

In the weeks following the tournament, Big Show and Kane feuded with Chris Masters and Carlito, leading to a World Tag Team Championship match being scheduled for WrestleMania 22. At WrestleMania, Big Show and Kane defeated Carlito and Masters, marking Big Show's first victory at WrestleMania. On the following night on Raw, Big Show and Kane lost the World Tag Team Championship to Spirit Squad members Kenny and Mikey following copious interference from the other members of the Spirit Squad. They faced Spirit Squad members Johnny and Nicky in a rematch one week later, but lost via disqualification after Kane "snapped" and left the ring to attack the other members of the Spirit Squad. The ensuing feud between Kane and Big Show culminated in a match at Backlash that ended in a ruling of no-contest.

ECW World Champion and departure (2006–2007) 

At WWE vs. ECW Head-to-Head on June 7, Big Show joined the newly debuted ECW brand as he removed his Raw shirt to reveal an ECW shirt during a twenty-man battle royal including members of the Raw and SmackDown! rosters against members of the ECW roster. Big Show won the match for ECW by eliminating Randy Orton. Big Show then appeared at ECW One Night Stand, attacking Tajiri, Super Crazy and The Full Blooded Italians after their tag team match.

On the July 4 episode of ECW, Big Show defeated Rob Van Dam to win the ECW World Heavyweight Championship in Philadelphia with the assistance of ECW's Representative Paul Heyman, who declined to make the three-count for Van Dam after Van Dam performed the Five Star Frog Splash on Big Show. Heyman then instructed Big Show to chokeslam Van Dam onto a chair, before making the three-count, meaning Big Show won the title. The fans almost rioted when Big Show won the title, throwing drinks and empty cups into the ring as Heyman and Big Show celebrated, turning heel in the process. The victory made him the first ever professional wrestler to hold the WWE Championship, WCW World Heavyweight Championship and ECW World Heavyweight Championship. He is also the first non-ECW Original to hold the title. Over the next several weeks, Big Show defeated many other wrestlers from other brands, such as Ric Flair and Kane to retain the now renamed ECW World Championship, but lost to Batista and The Undertaker by disqualification. Big Show lost to The Undertaker at The Great American Bash in the first ever Punjabi Prison match, replacing The Great Khali, who was removed by SmackDown! General Manager Theodore Long and replaced with Big Show as punishment for an attack on The Undertaker shortly before the match. He also had a brief feud with Sabu, whom he defeated at SummerSlam to retain the ECW World Championship. Also at SummerSlam, Big Show was one of the "resources" used by Vince and Shane McMahon in their match against D-Generation X (DX). He became further involved in the McMahons' feud with D-X when he teamed with Vince and Shane against Triple H and Shawn Michaels in a 3-on-2 handicap Hell in a Cell match at Unforgiven, which was won by DX. During the match, DX shoved Vince's head up Big Show's buttocks in a mockery of Vince's Kiss My Ass Club.

At Cyber Sunday, Big Show faced John Cena and King Booker in a Champion of Champions match. The fans voted for King Booker's World Heavyweight Championship to be on the line. However, Big Show failed to win the match, which was won by King Booker after pinning Cena following interference from Kevin Federline, who was just beginning a feud with Cena himself at the time. At Survivor Series, Big Show competed in the traditional 10-man Survivor Series tag team match which he lost after being pinned by Cena, the final survivor of the match along with Bobby Lashley. Big Show then began a feud with Lashley, who left SmackDown! to join the ECW brand to participate in the Extreme Elimination Chamber match at December to Dismember for the ECW World Championship. At December to Dismember, after busting Big Show open by breaking one of the plexiglass pods with his face, Lashley defeated Big Show to win the ECW World Championship. Following an unsuccessful rematch on the December 5 episode of ECW, Big Show took time off from the ring to heal injuries he had sustained on ECW. After two months of inactivity, Wight's contract expired on February 8, 2007.

Memphis Wrestling (2007) 
After a two-month departure from WWE, Wight replaced Jerry Lawler when the WWE withdrew him from a match with former nWo partner Hulk Hogan at the PMG Clash of Legends on April 27, 2007. Wight was introduced as Paul "The Great" Wight. He stated that "Big Show" was his slave name and that he did not want to be owned anymore. Hogan won the match after he bodyslammed Wight and pinned him following the leg drop.

Return to WWE (2008–2021)

Unified WWE Tag Team Champion (2008–2010) 

On February 17, 2008, at No Way Out, Big Show made his return to WWE television, attempted to attack Rey Mysterio after his World Heavyweight Championship match with Edge but got into a physical confrontation with boxer Floyd Mayweather Jr. after Mayweather came from the crowd to challenge Big Show. The confrontation ended with Mayweather breaking Big Show's nose with a punching combination. Big Show lost to Mayweather at WrestleMania XXIV by knockout after a shot to the jaw with brass knuckles. He turned face soon after.

At One Night Stand, Big Show defeated CM Punk, John Morrison, Chavo Guerrero, and Tommy Dreamer in a Singapore Cane match. During the bout, he received a black eye and deep gash along the eyebrow, which required stitches after Morrison swung a Singapore cane to his knee, which caused Big Show to fall with the steps. As he fell, the steps accidentally moved to the right, which hit Big Show in the eye. The win gave him contention to face Kane and Mark Henry at Night of Champions for the ECW Championship, which Henry won by pinning Kane.

Big Show was then assigned to the SmackDown brand. Big Show turned heel once again by siding with Vickie Guerrero in her ongoing feud with The Undertaker by attacking him at Unforgiven and later interfering in many of Undertaker's matches on SmackDown. He defeated Undertaker by knockout at No Mercy. However, Big Show lost to Undertaker in a fan-voted Last Man Standing match at Cyber Sunday and a Casket Match at Survivor Series. Big Show then lost a Steel Cage match against The Undertaker on the December 5 episode of SmackDown, ending the feud. In March, it was revealed by John Cena that the Big Show was having secret relations with Vickie Guerrero. At WrestleMania 25, Big Show was involved in a Triple Threat match for the World Heavyweight Championship featuring champion Edge and eventual winner Cena.

On April 13, Big Show was drafted to the Raw brand as a part of the 2009 WWE draft. At Backlash, Big Show interfered in a Last Man Standing match for the World Heavyweight Championship between Cena and Edge when he threw Cena into a spotlight, thus resulting in Edge winning the title and Cena being seriously injured. He continued to feud with John Cena, losing to him at Judgment Day by pinfall and at Extreme Rules in a submission match, before defeating Cena on the June 22 episode of Raw to end the feud.

In the weeks prior to Night of Champions, Big Show constantly attacked United States Champion Kofi Kingston and Evan Bourne among others. He then feuded with Kingston over the United States Championship and earned himself a spot in the six-pack challenge at Night of Champions. At Night of Champions, Big Show was introduced as Chris Jericho's new tag team partner due to Edge needing time off to tend to an injury, thus taking Big Show out of the six-pack challenge for the United States Championship. Together, Jeri-Show were able to successfully defend the Unified WWE Tag Team Championship against The Legacy. Jeri-Show successfully defended the titles against Cryme Tyme at SummerSlam, MVP and Mark Henry at Breaking Point and Rey Mysterio and Batista at Hell in a Cell. At Bragging Rights, Big Show represented Team Raw, but he betrayed and attacked his teammates, which led to Team SmackDown winning, so that he could receive an opportunity at the World Heavyweight Championship. Big Show received his title shot at Survivor Series in a triple threat match against The Undertaker and Jericho, but the Undertaker successfully retained his title.

Jeri-Show lost the Unified WWE Tag Team Championship at TLC: Tables, Ladders and Chairs to D-Generation X (DX) in a Tables, Ladders and Chairs match. As a member of the SmackDown roster, Jericho could only appear on Raw as a champion and so DX intentionally disqualified themselves in a rematch to force Jericho off the show. Eventually the teams had a match with a definitive finish on the January 4 episode of Raw, though DX still won, signalling the end of Jeri-Show.

On the February 8 episode of Raw, Big Show regained the titles from DX with his new tag team partner The Miz in a Triple Threat Tag Team Elimination match, which also included the Straight Edge Society (CM Punk and Luke Gallows). On the February 16 episode of ECW, he and Miz successfully defended the titles against Yoshi Tatsu and Goldust on the final episode of the show. On the March 1 episode of Raw, Big Show and Miz defeated D-X in their rematch. At WrestleMania XXVI, Big Show and Miz defeated John Morrison and R-Truth to retain the titles again. At Extreme Rules ShoMiz was in a tag team gauntlet match where the team that beat them would get a title match the next night on Raw. ShoMiz beat the first two teams in the gauntlet match, John Morrison and R-Truth, then MVP and Mark Henry. They then lost to The Hart Dynasty, who earned the title shot. On the April 26, 2010, episode of Raw, Big Show and Miz lost the Unified WWE Tag Team Championship to The Hart Dynasty.

Championship pursuits and reunion with Kane (2010–2011) 
After the title loss, he attacked The Miz with a knockout punch and hugged Theodore Long, turning face in the process. Later on in the night as part of the 2010 WWE draft, Big Show was drafted back to the SmackDown brand. He returned to the brand on the April 30 episode of SmackDown and was subsequently named the number one contender for the World Heavyweight Championship, later on in the night, he interrupted World Heavyweight Champion Jack Swagger as he was giving his "State of Championship Address" and knocked him out with a WMD. On the May 7 episode of SmackDown, Big Show sat ringside during the Swagger/Kane main event. After Swagger was disqualified, Big Show chokeslammed him through the announce table. He also crashed Swagger's achievement celebration and cost him his match with Kofi Kingston in the next week. Big Show defeated Swagger via disqualification at Over the Limit, but did not win the title. On the May 28 episode of SmackDown, General Manager Theodore Long scheduled qualifying matches for the World Heavyweight Championship match at Fatal 4-Way and that Big Show had already qualified by defeating Jack Swagger via disqualification at Over the Limit. At Fatal 4-Way, Big Show faced Rey Mysterio, CM Punk and Swagger for the World Heavyweight Championship, but Mysterio won the title. On the following episode of SmackDown, Swagger debuted his new finishing move, The Ankle Lock, and applied it on Big Show, thus injuring his ankle and continuing their feud. Two weeks later on SmackDown, Big Show saved Rey Mysterio, whose ankle was injured by the same move, from Swagger. Later that night, Big Show fought Swagger to a double count-out. Soon he began a feud with CM Punk and his Straight Edge Society, confronting him the Friday night before the Money in the Bank event, and unmasking him to reveal his bald head. After failing to win the SmackDown Money in the Bank ladder match at Money in the Bank, he fought the mysterious masked member of the SES, also unmasking him as Joey Mercury. Big Show's feud with the Straight Edge Society continued after he defeated them in a 3 on 1 Handicap match at SummerSlam and CM Punk at Night of Champions. Big Show was made Team SmackDown's captain for Bragging Rights on the October 8 episode of SmackDown. At Bragging Rights, Big Show was counted out with Sheamus during the match but his team ultimately won with Edge and Rey Mysterio left on the team. He was on Rey Mysterio's team for Survivor Series where he was a survivor along with Mysterio. The following episode of SmackDown, he was unsuccessful in qualifying for the King of the Ring tournament as he was defeated by Alberto Del Rio by count-out thanks to interference by his personal ring announcer, Ricardo Rodriguez.

On the January 7, 2011, episode of SmackDown, Big Show participated in a Fatal 4-Way match to determine the number one contender for the World Heavyweight Championship, losing due to interference by former Nexus leader Wade Barrett. The next week, Show faced Barrett and won via disqualification when former Nexus members Heath Slater and Justin Gabriel attacked him. Moments later Ezekiel Jackson appeared to help him, but instead attacked Big Show. The next week, Barrett, Slater, Gabriel and Jackson informed that they had formed the Corre. In the following weeks, the Corre continued to assault Show, due to the size and power of Ezekiel Jackson. At Elimination Chamber, Show participated in the Elimination Chamber match for the World Heavyweight Championship, eliminating Wade Barrett before being eliminated by Kane. Big Show feuded with The Corre in the following weeks.

On the March 4 episode of SmackDown, Big Show faced Kane in a confrontation until the Corre interfered on Kane's behalf. However, a miscommunication led to Kane turning on the Corre. Big Show and Kane thus reunited to take on the Corre. At WrestleMania XXVII, Big Show and Kane teamed with Santino Marella and Kofi Kingston to beat The Corre. On the April 22 episode of SmackDown, the duo defeated Corre members Justin Gabriel and Heath Slater to win the WWE Tag Team Championship, their second championship win as a team. Big Show was drafted back to the Raw brand as a part of the 2011 WWE draft. He and Kane then started feuding with the New Nexus. After defending the titles against Wade Barrett and Ezekiel Jackson at Extreme Rules and CM Punk and Mason Ryan at Over the Limit, Kane and Big Show lost their titles to Michael McGilligutty and David Otunga on the following night on Raw. After losing the titles, Big Show was run over by Alberto Del Rio's car, driven by his ring announcer Ricardo Rodriguez, and was sidelined with an injury for almost a month. He returned during a match between Kane and Del Rio, attacking both Del Rio and Rodriguez.

Big Show then began feuding with Mark Henry after he attacked and injured him on the June 17 episode of SmackDown, as Big Show's frustrations and anger towards Del Rio was redirected unintentionally to Mark Henry. Henry retaliated by attacking Big Show during his match at Capitol Punishment and attacking him with the World's Strongest Slam through an announce table, causing Big Show to lose to Del Rio by knockout. Henry did the same thing on Kane through the broadcast table the next night on Raw after their arm wrestling match, and again on the June 27 episode of Raw when Henry then broke the cage door during the steel cage match between Big Show and Alberto Del Rio, allowing Del Rio to escape. He then attacked Big Show with the cage door, breaking the cage viciously. On July 17, 2011, at Money in the Bank, Henry defeated Big Show. After the match, Henry fractured Big Show's fibula, keeping him out of action for almost three months.

World Heavyweight Champion (2011–2013) 

On the October 7 episode of SmackDown, Big Show returned and became number one contender for the World Heavyweight Championship after he attacked Mark Henry and chokeslammed him through the broadcast table. At Vengeance, Big Show fought Henry to a no-contest after the ring collapsed following a superplex from Henry, similar to his match with Brock Lesnar in 2003. This time, less damage was done, and the damage mainly occurred around the lower right-hand ring post. Big Show ended up being taken out on a motorized cart with a flatbed. Big Show faced Mark Henry for the World Heavyweight Championship once again at Survivor Series winning via disqualification when Henry hit Big Show with a low blow, afterwards he leg dropped a chair on Henry's leg, much like what Henry did to Big Show months before.

On December 18 at TLC: Tables, Ladders and Chairs, Big Show finally defeated Henry for the World Heavyweight Championship in a Chairs Match. Afterwards, Henry knocked Big Show out with a DDT onto a chair and Daniel Bryan immediately cashed his Money in the Bank contract on Big Show to win the title. This gave Big Show the shortest-ever World Heavyweight Championship reign at 45 seconds. Big Show challenged Bryan for the World Heavyweight Championship on the January 6, 2012, episode of SmackDown, but Bryan retained his title by disqualification when he goaded Mark Henry into attacking him. The next week on SmackDown, Big Show received a rematch for the title contested under no disqualification, no count-out rules. Bryan again retained his title as the rematch ended in a no-contest after Big Show accidentally crashed into AJ (Bryan's storyline girlfriend) at ringside, injuring her. At the 2012 Royal Rumble, Big Show faced Bryan and Henry in a triple threat steel cage match for the World Heavyweight Championship, but Bryan escaped the steel cage to retain his title. At the Elimination Chamber event, Big Show failed again to capture the World Heavyweight Championship in an Elimination Chamber match after he was eliminated second by Cody Rhodes.

In the following weeks, Big Show began a feud with Rhodes after Rhodes highlighted Big Show's embarrassing moments in previous WrestleManias, often costing Big Show to lose matches in the process. At WrestleMania XXVIII, Big Show defeated Rhodes to win the Intercontinental Championship. With this, Big Show became the twenty-fourth wrestler to win the Triple Crown Championship and the twelfth Grand Slam Champion in the WWE, and is currently the most recent wrestler to complete the original Grand Slam format. Big Show then began highlighting embarrassing moments in Rhodes' career. After a four-week reign, Big Show lost the Intercontinental Championship back to Rhodes at Extreme Rules in a Tables match. Big Show received his rematch on the May 7 episode of Raw, where he defeated Rhodes via countout after Rhodes walked out on the match. After a series of confrontations with Raw and SmackDown General Manager John Laurinaitis, Big Show was fired by Laurinaitis for making fun of his voice on the May 14 episode of Raw.

Six days later, Big Show returned at Over the Limit, seemingly to help John Cena in his match against John Laurinaitis; instead, he knocked Cena out with a WMD and allowed Laurinaitis to win the match by pinfall, turning heel in the process. The following night on Raw, Big Show explained that his actions were of necessity to keep his job in the WWE, therefore resulting in Laurinaitis re-signing him to an "ironclad contract with a big fat bonus", also stating that nobody showed him any sympathy when he got fired. Over the next few weeks, he attacked Cena, Brodus Clay, Alex Riley, R-Truth, Santino Marella, Zack Ryder, and Kofi Kingston because of the terms of his contract. On the June 11 episode of Raw, he accidentally knocked out Vince McMahon after McMahon decided that Laurinatis would be fired if Big Show lost to Cena at No Way Out in a steel cage match. Big Show went on to lose that match at No Way Out and as per stipulation, Laurinaitis was fired. At Money in the Bank, Big Show faced Cena, Kane, Chris Jericho, and The Miz in the WWE Championship Money in the Bank ladder match, but was unsuccessful as the match was won by Cena. On July 23 at Raw 1000, Big Show attacked Cena during his WWE Championship match against CM Punk causing a disqualification. He continued the attack on Cena until The Rock made the save. The following week on Raw, a WWE Championship number one contenders match between Big Show and Cena ended in a no contest due to interference from Punk. Following this, both Big Show and Cena were entered in the championship match at SummerSlam by Raw General Manager AJ Lee. At SummerSlam, however, Big Show was unsuccessful as Punk retained the title.

Big Show returned on the September 24 episode of Raw, attacking Brodus Clay and Tensai during their match. Four days later on SmackDown, Big Show defeated Randy Orton to become the number one contender to the World Heavyweight Championship. Big Show received his title opportunity on October 28 at Hell in a Cell, where he defeated Sheamus to win the World Heavyweight Championship for the second time. On November 18 at Survivor Series, Big Show lost a title rematch to Sheamus via disqualification and retaining the World Heavyweight Championship as a result. After the match, Sheamus attacked Big Show and repeatedly hit him with a chair. This led to a Chairs match on December 16 at TLC: Tables, Ladders and Chairs, where Big Show defeated Sheamus to retain the World Heavyweight Championship. On the December 24 episode of Raw, Big Show was defeated by Sheamus in a non-title lumberjack match. On the December 28 episode of SmackDown, Big Show defended his title against Alberto Del Rio, however, the match ended in a no-contest after Sheamus interfered and attacked Big Show. Three days later on the December 31 episode of Raw, Big Show defended the World Heavyweight Championship against Del Rio's ring announcer Ricardo Rodriguez and defeated him via disqualification after Del Rio attacked Big Show from behind. On the January 11 episode of SmackDown, Big Show lost the World Heavyweight Championship to Del Rio in a Last Man Standing match, ending his reign at 72 days. Big Show received his rematch for the title in another Last Man Standing match on January 27 at the Royal Rumble, but was again defeated by Del Rio when Rodriguez used duct tape to stop Big Show from getting up. After Big Show repeatedly attacked Del Rio and Rodriguez, Del Rio defeated Big Show via submission on February 17 at Elimination Chamber to again retain his title.

On the March 1 episode of SmackDown, Big Show knocked out Roman Reigns of The Shield with the KO Punch after Reigns was shoved into him during an attack on Randy Orton and Sheamus. After the March 4 episode of Raw went off-air, Big Show was attacked by the Shield. Four days later on SmackDown, Big Show again assisted Sheamus and Orton in warding off The Shield, though he hit Sheamus with a KO Punch and was hit with an RKO by Orton in return. On the March 11 episode of Raw, Big Show defeated Shield member Seth Rollins via disqualification after the rest of The Shield interfered. Orton and Sheamus were then allowed to pick a third partner to face the Shield in a six-man tag team match at WrestleMania 29 and originally chose Ryback. However, on the March 18 episode of Raw, Ryback was booked in another match at the event, leaving the spot open. Later that night, Big Show saved the two from an attack by The Shield and was immediately recruited as their partner. On April 7 at WrestleMania, Big Show, Orton and Sheamus were defeated by The Shield, after which, Big Show knocked out both Orton and Sheamus. The following night on Raw, Orton and Sheamus faced off in a match to earn a match with Big Show, however, the match ended in a no contest after Big Show interfered. Big Show was then defeated by Orton and Sheamus in two handicap matches, first on the April 12 episode of SmackDown via count-out, and second on the April 15 episode of Raw via pinfall. On the April 19 episode of SmackDown, Big Show teamed up with old rival Mark Henry to defeat Orton and Sheamus in a tag team match, with Big Show pinning Orton for the win. The feud between Big Show and Orton led to an Extreme Rules match on May 19 at Extreme Rules, which Big Show lost. After Extreme Rules, Big Show took a hiatus from WWE television.

The Authority (2013–2016) 

Big Show made his televised return to WWE on the August 12 episode of Raw, and helped Mark Henry and Rob Van Dam from an attack by The Shield, turning face in the process. On the August 16 episode of SmackDown, Big Show, Henry, and Van Dam defeated the Shield in a six-man tag team match. After speaking out against COO Triple H on the following Raw, Big Show was placed into a three-on-one handicap tornado tag team match against The Shield, which he lost.  Following this, the Authority (Triple H and Stephanie McMahon) claimed Big Show was broke, and in order to save his job, forced him to knock out his friends including Daniel Bryan, Dusty Rhodes, and The Miz. At Battleground, he interfered in the WWE Championship match between Bryan and Randy Orton (the later of whom was allied with the Authority) and knocked out both of them, ending the match in a no-contest. He then faced Orton for the WWE Championship at Survivor Series but failed to win.

At TLC: Tables, Ladders and Chairs, Big Show teamed with Rey Mysterio to unsuccessfully challenge Cody Rhodes and Goldust for the WWE Tag Team Championship in a four-way match, also involving RybAxel (Ryback and Curtis Axel), and The Real Americans (Antonio Cesaro and Jack Swagger). He subsequently started a feud with Brock Lesnar, which was settled at the Royal Rumble, where he was defeated. Big Show later participated in the André the Giant Memorial Battle Royal at WrestleMania XXX, being the last person eliminated by winner Cesaro. On the September 26 episode of SmackDown, Big Show started a feud with Rusev, when he defeated him by disqualification, but Rusev was ultimately successful in a rematch at Hell in a Cell.

Big Show turned heel when joined the Authority at Survivor Series when he turned on John Cena and caused him to be eliminated from the Survivor Series elimination match against the Authority. In his first pay-per-view match as part of the faction, Big Show defeated Erick Rowan in a first-ever Steel Stairs match at Tables, Ladders, and Chairs. Later in the event, Big Show attacked Cena during his match with Seth Rollins but was then confronted by Roman Reigns, leading to Cena winning the match. Reigns went on to defeat Big Show multiple times by count-out and disqualification. On January 25, 2015, at the Royal Rumble, Big Show entered the Royal Rumble match at #29, eliminating five superstars before being eliminated by Reigns, the eventual winner. At Fastlane, Big Show, Rollins and Kane defeated Dolph Ziggler, Erick Rowan and Ryback. Big Show went on to win the 2nd Annual André the Giant Memorial Battle Royal at WrestleMania 31. However, Big Show lost to Reigns in a Last Man Standing match at Extreme Rules.

After a brief hiatus, Big Show returned on the June 1 episode of Raw, where he knocked out The Miz and confronted Intercontinental Champion Ryback. Big Show challenged Ryback for his title at Money in the Bank, winning the match by disqualification after The Miz attacked Big Show. A triple threat match for the title took place at SummerSlam, where Ryback retained the title. On the August 31 episode of Raw, Big Show received another championship match against Ryback, which he lost following a distraction from The Miz, ending the feud.

Big Show later became involved in the Authority's feud with Sting, facing him in a match on the September 14 episode of Raw. The  match ended in a disqualification after interference from Seth Rollins. This led to John Cena storming the ring and the match becoming a tag team match with the team of Cena and Sting defeating the team of Big Show and Rollins. He was subsequently defeated by Brock Lesnar in the main event of Live from Madison Square Garden. On the November 9 episode of Raw, Big Show entered the 16-man tournament to crown the new WWE World Heavyweight Champion and lost to Roman Reigns in the first round. At the Royal Rumble, Big Show entered the Royal Rumble match at #15 and eliminated Ryback and Titus O'Neil before being eliminated by Braun Strowman.

On the January 28, 2016, episode of SmackDown, Big Show turned face by helping Roman Reigns, Dean Ambrose, and Chris Jericho fend off all the members of The Wyatt Family, whom he, Kane and Ryback defeated at Fastlane after several singles matches against the likes of Erick Rowan and Braun Strowman, mostly in winning efforts, leading up to the event. However, the next night on Raw, The Wyatt Family would defeat the trio in a rematch. At WrestleMania 32, Big Show and Kane participated in the Andre the Giant Memorial Battle Royal, where Big Show faced off with Shaquille O'Neal, but the other participants would gang up on the two powerhouses and they were eliminated simultaneously. Kane and Big Show subsequently defeated Braun Strowman and Erick Rowan on the April 19 episode of Main Event, ending their feud the Wyatt Family in the process.

Sporadic appearances and departure (2016–2021) 

Big Show was drafted to Raw as part of the 2016 WWE draft. During this time, Big Show began appearing mostly on the live event circuit rather than televised events, as he transitioned into a part-time role. At the Royal Rumble on January 29, 2017, Big Show entered the Royal Rumble match at number 9, but was eliminated by Braun Strowman. After defeating Rusev at Fastlane, he competed in the André the Giant Memorial Battle Royal at WrestleMania 33, from which he was also eliminated by Strowman. Big Show wrestled Strowman two weeks later on Raw, where the ring collapsed after Strowman superplexed him, resulting in the match going to a no contest, similar to his matches with Brock Lesnar in 2003 and Mark Henry in 2011, respectively. Throughout the summer of 2017, Big Show feuded with Big Cass, culminating in a match at  SummerSlam, where he was defeated. On the September 4 episode of Raw, Big Show lost to Strowman in a steel cage match and was thrown through the cage after the match. The attack was written to take Big Show off television as he required hip surgery. His next appearance for WWE was on April 6, 2018, when he inducted his long-time friend and rival Mark Henry into the WWE Hall of Fame class of 2018.

Big Show returned on the October 9 episode of SmackDown, where he faced Randy Orton in a losing effort. The following week, on the 1000th episode of SmackDown, Big Show formed a short-lived alliance with The Bar (Cesaro and Sheamus) by helping them defeat The New Day for the SmackDown Tag Team Championship, thus turning heel in the process. This alliance ended on the November 27 episode of SmackDown, after Big Show performed a KO Punch on Cesaro backstage. Following this, Big Show was written off television due to him suffering a hamstring injury.

On the January 6, 2020, episode of Raw, Big Show returned from injury over a year later as a fan favorite, teaming with Kevin Owens and Samoa Joe to defeat Seth Rollins and AOP via disqualification. In a match filmed after WrestleMania 36 ended, which aired on the April 6 episode of Raw, Big Show reverted to a heel after insulting and challenging newly crowned WWE Champion Drew McIntyre for his title. He was subsequently defeated. His heel turn was short-lived, as Big Show turned face again by helping The Street Profits and The Viking Raiders fend off the group of ninjas led by Akira Tozawa on the June 15 episode of Raw. He last wrestled in an unsanctioned match against Orton on the July 20 episode of Raw.

On November 22, 2020, he made an appearance at Survivor Series during The Undertaker's retirement ceremony. He made his final WWE appearance on the January 4, 2021, edition of Raw for Legends Night. Wight and WWE parted ways the following month after it was reported the two sides were unable to agree to financial terms on a new contract. Wight also cited "creative frustrations" and lack of ideas as reasons for his exit.

Cameo (2022)
On the June 27, 2022, episode of Raw, Big Show appeared via video to congratulate John Cena on his career.

All Elite Wrestling (2021–present) 
On February 24, 2021, All Elite Wrestling (AEW) announced that Big Show, now known in AEW by his real name, Paul Wight, had signed with the company and would be providing commentary alongside Tony Schiavone for their new YouTube series AEW Dark: Elevation, which premiered on March 15. It was also confirmed that while commentary for Elevation would be his initial role, he would also compete as an in-ring performer. He debuted on the March 3 episode of AEW Dynamite titled The Crossroads and announced he had a "big scoop" that AEW would sign "a Hall of Fame worthy talent that is a huge surprise and a huge asset" at Revolution which was revealed to be Christian Cage. He also had some matches on AEW, most notably, defeating Q. T. Marshall at All Out.

Legacy 
Wight has often been compared to André the Giant throughout his career due to both suffering from acromegaly and having a similar overall body structure to André. Unlike André, who was content with his fate, Wight had surgery of the pituitary gland to halt his condition. The similarities led to WCW billing him as André's son early in his career (despite no biological relation) and WWE involving him in similar angles as André. Wight has also stated that many older fans in the Southern United States (where Wight is from and where André made his home in the United States) not aware of kayfabe have often told Wight during autograph sessions how much they "loved his father when he wrestled", even though Wight's biological father was a mechanic. Wight would also outlive André, who died at age 46.

Wight is also well known for his frequent turns between face and heel throughout his career, to the point it has become a running gag among wrestling fans. One wrestling site has estimated that through 2018 Wight has made approximately 34 turns since his WCW debut in 1995, four of those alone coming during his first year with the WWF. Wight himself acknowledged that while the frequent turns may have hurt his legacy and his mystique, he was also honored with the fact that he can play both roles well and fit in wherever he is needed to put younger talent over.

Other media 
Big Show has been featured in infomercials for Stacker 2 with former NASCAR drivers Kenny Wallace and Scott Wimmer, NASCAR Xfinity Series driver Elliott Sadler, retired crew chief turned Fox Sports broadcaster Jeff Hammond, and 2002, 2005, and 2011 Sprint Cup Champion Tony Stewart. In addition, Wight appeared on the "Thong Song" remix music video by Sisqó and Foxy Brown. Wight was featured on the game show Are You Smarter Than a 5th Grader?, winning $15,000 for his chosen charity, United Service Organizations. He is the only contestant to appear on two versions of the game show in two different countries. On March 31, 2012, Big Show won the first-ever Slime Wrestling World Championship at the Nickelodeon Kids' Choice Awards, defeating The Miz after throwing him into a tub of slime. In 2018, The Big Show appeared in the Wizards of the Coast's  Dungeons and Dragons stream "Stream of Many Eyes Day Three - Jocks Machina" alongside Joe Manganiello, Travis Willingham, cross fit athlete Ron Mathews, and Mike Mearls as Dungeon Master.

Filmography

Personal life 
Wight married his first wife, Melissa Ann Piavis, in 1997. They separated in 2000 and their divorce was finalized in 2002. Together, they have a daughter. In 2002, he married his second wife, Bess Katramados. They have two children together.

For many years, Wight has been an active supporter of Special Olympics, including the 2014 Special Olympics USA Games in New Jersey, where he participated in the Opening Ceremony. He was later named WWE Goodwill Ambassador for the 2015 Special Olympics World Games in Los Angeles. Since 2018, he has served as a Global Ambassador for Special Olympics International.

Legal issues
Wight was arrested in December 1998 by the Memphis Police Department for allegedly exposing himself to a female motel employee who was the front desk clerk at a hotel in Memphis, Tennessee. The charge though was subsequently dropped due to insufficient evidence.

In March 1999, Wight was charged with assault by Robert Sawyer, who alleged that Wight had broken his jaw during the summer of 1998 in the course of an altercation at Marriott Hotels & Resorts in Uniondale, New York. Wight claimed that Sawyer had verbally abused, threatened, and shoved him, and that he had responded by punching Sawyer. After three days, Judge Thomas Feinman delivered a verdict of not guilty.

Championships and accomplishments 

 Pro Wrestling Illustrated
 Rookie of the Year (1996)
 Wrestler of the Year (1996)
 Ranked him No. 2 of the top 500 singles wrestlers of the year in the PWI 500 in 1996
Ranked him No. 137 of the top 500 singles wrestlers of the PWI Years in 2003
 World Championship Wrestling
 WCW World Heavyweight Championship (2 times)
 WCW World Tag Team Championship (3 times) – with Lex Luger (1), Sting (1), and Scott Hall (1)
 World War 3 (1996)
 World Wrestling Federation/World Wrestling Entertainment/WWE
 WWF/E Championship (2 times)
 ECW World Championship (1 time)
 World Heavyweight Championship (2 times)
 WWF/E Hardcore Championship (3 times)
 WWE United States Championship (1 time)
 WWE Intercontinental Championship (1 time)
 WWE Tag Team Championship (3 times) – with Chris Jericho (1), The Miz (1), and Kane (1)
 WWF/World Tag Team Championship (5 times) – with The Undertaker (2), Kane (1), Chris Jericho (1), and The Miz (1)
 André the Giant Memorial Trophy (2015)
 Bragging Rights Trophy (2010) – With Team SmackDown 
 24th Triple Crown Champion
 12th Grand Slam Champion
 Slammy Award (5 times)
 Tag Team of the Year (2009) – 
 Holy $#!+ Move of the Year (2011) – 
 Betrayal of the Year (2012) – 
 "This is Awesome" Moment of the Year (2013) – 
 Match of the Year (2014) – 
 Nickelodeon 
 Nickelodeon Slime Wrestling World Championship (1 time)

 Wrestling Observer Newsletter
 Most Embarrassing Wrestler (2002)
 Rookie of the Year (1996)
 Best Gimmick (1996) – nWo
 Feud of the Year (1996) New World Order vs. World Championship Wrestling
 Worst Feud of the Year (1999) 
 Worst Feud of the Year (2013) 
 Worst Wrestler (2001, 2002)

References

Bibliography

External links 

 
 
 

1972 births
All Elite Wrestling personnel
American male film actors
American male professional wrestlers
American male television actors
American male voice actors
American men's basketball players
Basketball players from South Carolina
ECW Heavyweight Champions/ECW World Heavyweight Champions
Living people
Male actors from South Carolina
Northern Oklahoma Mavericks men's basketball players
NWA/WCW/WWE United States Heavyweight Champions
Professional wrestlers from Florida
Professional wrestlers from South Carolina
Professional wrestling announcers
SIU Edwardsville Cougars men's basketball players
Sportspeople from Aiken, South Carolina
Sportspeople from Tampa, Florida
The Authority (professional wrestling) members
New World Order (professional wrestling) members
University of Central Oklahoma alumni
WCW World Heavyweight Champions
Wichita State Shockers men's basketball players
World Heavyweight Champions (WWE)
Wrestlers with acromegaly
WWF/WWE Intercontinental Champions
WWE Champions
WWE Grand Slam champions
WWF/WWE Hardcore Champions
20th-century professional wrestlers
21st-century professional wrestlers
WCW World Tag Team Champions